Denis Vladimirovich Solovyov (born 18 August 1977) is a Russian professional football coach and a former player.

Club career
He played 6 seasons in the Russian Football National League for FC Lada Togliatti, FC Volgar-Gazprom Astrakhan and FC Lisma-Mordoviya Saransk.

References

1977 births
Living people
Russian footballers
Association football goalkeepers
FC Lada-Tolyatti players
FC Kairat players
FC Petrolul Ploiești players
FC Zhemchuzhina Sochi players
FC Volgar Astrakhan players
FC Mordovia Saransk players
Latvian Higher League players
Kazakhstan Premier League players
Liga II players
Russian expatriate footballers
Expatriate footballers in Latvia
Russian expatriate sportspeople in Latvia
Expatriate footballers in Kazakhstan
Russian expatriate sportspeople in Kazakhstan
Expatriate footballers in Romania
Russian expatriate sportspeople in Romania
FC Nosta Novotroitsk players